16th CFCA Awards
January 21, 2004

Best Film: 
 The Lord of the Rings:The Return of the King 

The 16th Chicago Film Critics Association Awards, honoring the best in film for 2003, were presented in 2004. The awards were originally going to be cancelled because the 2003 screener ban but when a judge ruled against it and the studios started to send out screeners again the awards were held after all.

Peter Jackson's final part of "The Lord of the Rings" trilogy "The Return of the King" and Sofia Coppola's "Lost in Translation" both won three awards.

Winners

Best Actor:
Bill Murray - Lost in Translation
Best Actress:
Charlize Theron - Monster
Best Cinematography:
Lost in Translation - Lance Acord
Best Director:
Peter Jackson - The Lord of the Rings: The Return of the King
Best Documentary Feature:
The Fog of War
Best Film:
The Lord of the Rings: The Return of the King
Best Foreign Language Film:
Cidade de Deus (City of God), Brazil/France/United States
Best Original Score:
The Lord of the Rings: The Return of the King - Howard Shore
Best Screenplay:
Lost in Translation - Sofia Coppola
Best Supporting Actor:
Tim Robbins - Mystic River
Best Supporting Actress:
Patricia Clarkson - Pieces of April
Most Promising Filmmaker:
Niki Caro - Whale Rider
Most Promising Performer:
Keisha Castle-Hughes - Whale Rider

References

https://web.archive.org/web/20120515203059/http://www.chicagofilmcritics.org/index.php?option=com_content&view=article&id=48&Itemid=58

 2003
2003 film awards